This a list of the all participating squads at the 2006 FIVB Volleyball Men's World Championship, held in several cities in Japan from 17 November to 3 December 2006.

Squads

Argentina

Australia

Brazil

Bulgaria

Canada

China

Cuba

Czech Republic

Egypt

France

Germany

Greece

Iran

Italy

Japan

Kazakhstan

Poland

Puerto Rico

Russia

Serbia and Montenegro

South Korea

Tunisia

United States

Venezuela

References

External links
Official website

S
FIVB Volleyball Men's World Championship squads